"Empire" is a song by Belgian singer and songwriter Blanche. It was released as a digital download on 13 February 2020 by PIAS Belgium as the lead single from her debut studio album Empire.

Background
On her Instagram account, Blanche said, "I couldn't be happier with the way things have turned out and I truely [sic] hope the song reaches your heart."

Charts

Release history

Notes

References

2020 songs
2020 singles
Blanche (singer) songs
Songs written by Pierre Dumoulin (songwriter)
Songs written by Blanche (singer)